Zhōnghuá, Chung¹-hua² or Chunghwa is a term that means "China" or "relating to China", in a cultural, ethnic, or literary sense. It is used in the following terms:

People's Republic of China
 , the Chinese name for the People's Republic of China
Zhonghua (car), cars produced by Brilliance China Auto
Chunghwa (cigarette), premium brand of cigarettes
Chung Hwa Pencil, a famous pencil brand owned by Lao Feng Xiang.
Chung-hwa, toothpaste brand owned by Unilever.

Subdistricts 
Zhonghua Subdistrict, Xiamen, in Siming District, Xiamen, Fujian

Republic of China
 or Chunghwa Minkuo, the Republic of China in Chinese
Chunghwa Telecom
Chunghwa Post, the official postal service of Taiwan
Chung Hua University, a private university in Xiangshan District, Hsinchu City, Taiwan
Chung-Hua Institution for Economic Research, a Taiwan-based international policy think tank
Chunghwa Postal Museum, a museum located in Zhongzheng District, Taipei, Taiwan
, China Airlines in Chinese

Other uses
Huaxia, a name representing the Chinese civilisation
Zhonghua minzu, literally the Chinese nation
Little China (ideology), or "Xiao Zhonghua", conception of the political and cultural realm of China in the Sinosphere
A school in Singapore. See primary schools in Singapore.
Chong Hua Hospital, a hospital in Cebu City, Philippines
Zamboanga Chong Hua High School, a school in Zamboanga City, Philippines
Davao Chong Hua High School, a school in Davao City, Philippines
Lanao Chung Hua School, a school in Iligan City, Philippines
 China Motor Bus, a real estate developer and former public bus service operator in Hong Kong
 CLP Power, a multinational power company based in Kowloon, Hong Kong
 Hong Kong and China Gas, supplier of towngas in Hong Kong and numerous other markets

See also
 Sinocentrism
 Sinosphere
 Chunghwasan
 China (disambiguation)